was a Japanese-American jazz pianist, composer and teacher living in Brooklyn, New York.

Biography
Shirasaki was born September 16, 1969, and started classical piano lessons at age 5; she was also intrigued by her father's professional trombone-playing. She began her professional career at the age of twelve by playing gigs in her family's band at the "J" jazz club in Tokyo.

After attending the Tokyo Metropolitan High School for Arts, Shirasaki majored in classical music at the Tokyo National University of Fine Arts and Music and gave concerts as a classical pianist for several years after graduating before returning to play jazz.

Shirasaki moved to New York City in 1997 to pursue a master's degree at the Manhattan School of Music, studying with Kenny Barron.  She met and married fellow-student Tom Landman; they lived in the Park Slope section of Brooklyn and had two children.  Shirasaki operated the Brooklyn location of the Sakura Music School, specializing in teaching music to small children with an emphasis on those of Japanese ancestry.  She performed regularly in the New York area, as well as touring internationally.

She succumbed to cancer, dying at home on 29 November 2021.

Career
In August 2003 the Japanese indie label What's New Records released her debut trio CD "Existence" (Lewis Nash on drums, Marco Panascia on bass) in Japan. "Musically Yours" her second CD was released in June, 2005. Before giving birth to her two children, Shirasaki's solo piano album Home Alone was released in April 2006. In the same year she has been featured on Marian McPartland's National Public Radio Show Piano Jazz. and on the compilation CD An NPR Jazz Christmas with Marian McPartland and Friends, Vol. 3.

She was a finalist in the Mary Lou Williams Women In Jazz Piano Competition in 2005 and 2006 and the Great American Jazz Piano Competition in 2004, 2005 and 2006.

After taking parental leave she continued her career with a performance at the 1st International Jazz Solo Piano Festival 2009 in Germany. In 2010 she performed at the Jazz Journalists Association Awards Gala.

Discography
 2003 - Existence
 2005 - Musically Yours
 2006 - Home Alone
 2010 - Falling Leaves - Live in Hamburg
2013 - Some Other Time

Compilations 
 2006 - An NPR Christmas Collection with Marian McPartland and Friends
 2006 - NPR Jazz Christmas With Marian McPartland and Friends III
 2009 - Best of 1st International Jazz Solo Piano Festival 2009

References

External links 
 
 Ayako Shirasaki at AllAboutJazz
 mp3 file for the pronunciation of the name Ayako Shirasaki

1969 births
2021 deaths
American women composers
American jazz composers
American jazz pianists
Bebop pianists
Japanese women composers
Japanese jazz composers
Japanese jazz pianists
Japanese women pianists
Mainstream jazz pianists
Swing pianists
Women jazz pianists
21st-century American pianists
21st-century American women pianists
Musicians from Tokyo